Drama 61-67 is a British anthology drama series which took a different title, based on year of transmission, each year.  It alternated with Armchair Theatre from ABC in the Sunday evening slot.

The series was described at the time as epitomising ATV drama.

It is unknown how many episodes exist or are missing, although Nigel Kneale's The Crunch is known to exist and is available on DVD.

References

External links

1960s British drama television series
1960s British anthology television series
Black-and-white British television shows
English-language television shows
Television shows produced by Associated Television (ATV)
1961 British television series debuts
1967 British television series endings